The Hanzinne is a stream, and a tributary of the river Sambre, in Belgium.

Its source is located in Hanzinne, a part of the Florennes municipality in the province of Namur.

It passes through Hymiée, Gerpinnes, Acoz and Bouffioulx and is connected with river Sambre in Châtelet.

See also 
 Meuse (river)
 List of rivers of Belgium

References

Rivers of Belgium
Rivers of Namur (province)
Florennes